Mousiotitsa or Kato Mousiotitsa is a village located in the Ioannina regional unit in the Epirus region of western Greece. Situated 33 km south of the city of Ioannina near the springs of the river Louros, the village consists of 4 areas: Kato Mousiotitsa, Ano Mousiotitsa, Nea Mousiotitsa and Mesoura. It is surrounded by 5 mountains: Bitera, Spithari, Pourizi, Kalogeritsa and Katafi.

The village has a permanent population of around 605 (2011 census), however, in the summer months the numbers can soar past 1000 as expatriates return from abroad (e.g. Sweden, Germany, USA, Canada) and from Athens and other larger cities.

As of 2011 the village belongs to the municipality of Dodoni after the merger of its previous municipal unit Agios Dimitrios with three other units.

History

Origin and etymology of name 
The true origin of the name Mousiotitsa is unknown. It has been speculated by scholars that the name may be of Slavic origin due to its conspicuous ending of "itsa" - a common occurrence in Slavic settlement names. Other more local theories suggest the name is derived from old myths of ancient river dwellers known as "Mouses" or from a queen who resided in what is now the ruins of a castle dating back to the 3rd century AD.

Initial settlement 

It is widely regarded to have been settled in the early 18th century. The old St. Nicholas church is first mentioned in the Greek church archives in the year 1791. Its first inhabitants are believed to have been Klephts and other refugees fleeing from Ottoman oppression or persecution. The shape of its geographical surroundings shielded the village and its inhabitants from view, thus providing a safe place to dwell. The village is believed to have  belonged to the group of villages that made up the Souli mountain settlements. Several facts support this belief, such as local names resembling common Souliot names and some knowledge of Arvanitika among village elders.

World War II Massacre 
On July 25, 1943, followed by 27 August 1943, German SS troops entered the village and executed a total of 153 civilians. The attack and resulting massacre was seen as retaliation by the Nazi German troops against alleged resistance activity in the village, and that it had supported a deadly attack on a German officer in the nearby area of Zita.

See also

List of settlements in the Ioannina regional unit
List of massacres in Greece

References

External links
 Σύλλογος Νέων Μουσιωτίτσας
 Αδελφότητα Μουσιωτίτσας
 Mousiotitsa massacre - online video documentary (in Greek)
 Video of Nea Mousiotitsa (shot using drone)

Nazi war crimes in Greece
Mass murder in 1943
Populated places in Ioannina (regional unit)
Albanian communities in Greece